Legal bibliography is the bibliography of law. The term has been applied to "the kinds and functions of legal materials" and to "lists of law books and related materials".

Percy Winfield said that a "perfect legal bibliography" would be "a critical and historical account of every known source of the law of the state with which it assumes to deal".

History
In 1835, David Hoffman said that the legal bibliography of France and Germany, especially in the separate treatises on various branches of the law, was, by that date, "extensive, exact and learned". He also said that in England "in jurisprudence (beyond a naked catalogue) we have scarce another name than Bridgman".

Marvin's Legal Bibliography was the first publication of its kind to originate from the United States of America.

In 1988, Bookman's Yearbook said that legal bibliography was in a "sorry state".

References
Friend, William Lawrence. Anglo-American Legal Bibliographies: An Annotated Guide. United States Government Printing Office. Washington DC. 1944.
George Watson and I. Willison. The New Cambridge Bibliography of English Literature. Cambridge University Press. Columns 2277 to 2280.

External links

Bibliography
Law